This is a complete list of seasons competed by the Hamilton Tiger-Cats, a Canadian Football League team. The Hamilton Football Club was formed on November 3, 1869 and was first referred to as the Tigers in a game against the Toronto Argonauts on October 18, 1873, while also wearing black and gold for the first time. In 1941, during World War II, a new team, named the Hamilton Wildcats began playing in the Ontario Rugby Football Union after the Tigers suspended operations due to most of their players fighting in the war. After the Tigers rejoined the IRFU, the two teams were simultaneously competing for the Grey Cup. In 1950, the two clubs merged under the moniker Hamilton Tiger-Cats after it became apparent that both teams would not be able to compete financially in the same market.

Throughout their history, the Tiger-Cats have won eight Grey Cups and Hamilton franchises combined have won 15 Grey Cups.

Hamilton Tiger-Cats lists